Zsanett Németh (born 21 January 1994) is a Hungarian wrestler. She participated at the 2010 Summer Youth Olympics in Singapore. She represented her country at the 2016 Summer Olympics held in Rio de Janeiro, Brazil. She won silver medal at the 2017 European Wrestling Championships held in Novi Sad, Serbia.

In March 2021, she competed at the European Qualification Tournament in Budapest, Hungary hoping to qualify for the 2020 Summer Olympics in Tokyo, Japan. In April 2021, she was eliminated in her first match in the 76 kg event at the 2021 European Wrestling Championships in Warsaw, Poland. In May 2021, she failed to qualify for the Olympics at the World Olympic Qualification Tournament held in Sofia, Bulgaria. She won her first match against Iselin Moen Solheim of Norway but she was then eliminated in her next match by Martina Kuenz of Austria.

Major results

References

External links 
 
 
 
 

1994 births
Living people
Hungarian female sport wrestlers
Wrestlers at the 2010 Summer Youth Olympics
Wrestlers at the 2016 Summer Olympics
Wrestlers at the 2015 European Games
Olympic wrestlers of Hungary
Wrestlers at the 2019 European Games
European Wrestling Championships medalists
European Games competitors for Hungary
21st-century Hungarian women